Bracebridge (Stone Wall Farm) Aerodrome  is  east southeast of Bracebridge, Ontario, Canada.

See also
 List of airports in the Bracebridge area

References

Registered aerodromes in Ontario
Transport in Bracebridge, Ontario